Cameron Ross Phelps (born 11 February 1985) is an Australian former professional rugby league footballer who last played for the Widnes Vikings in the Super League.

Playing career
Phelps made his first grade debut for Canterbury in 2005 against Manly.  Phelps spent 4 years at Canterbury but mainly played in reserve grade.  In 2008, Phelps joined English side Wigan.

Phelps was released by Wigan in 2010 and signed for Hull F.C. on 9 February 2011. Phelps made 20 appearances and scoring 3 tries for Hull in the 2011 season but was released from contract. 

Phelps signed a two year Super League contract with Widnes on 20 January 2012. He returned to Australia in 2015. Following in the footsteps of his successful older brother James, who writes for Sydney's The Daily Telegraph and is a novelist, Cameron writes for Mail Online.

References

External links 

Bulldogs profile
Official NRL profile
 Cameron Phelps Wigan Career Page on the Wigan RL Fansite.

1985 births
Australian rugby league players
Australian expatriate sportspeople in England
Canterbury-Bankstown Bulldogs players
Wigan Warriors players
Hull F.C. players
Widnes Vikings players
Rugby league wingers
Rugby league centres
Rugby league fullbacks
Living people
Rugby league players from Sydney